Joaquim Sunyer (Sitges, 1874–1956) was a Catalan painter often linked to the Noucentisme movement.

He began his artistic education with his uncle, Joaquim Mir, later moving to Barcelona where his fellow students included Joaquín Torres García, Isidro Nonell, and Joaquin Mir Trinxet. In 1896 he moved to Paris, where he became acquainted with the neo-impressionist movement and worked extensively in the style. His paintings of this period include street scenes of working-class life. He also produced graphic works influenced by Toulouse-Lautrec and Théophile Steinlen that emphasize urban night life and urban poverty.  He was friends with Picasso, and in the first years of the 20th century the two artists' work were similar in style and subject.

In 1908, Sunyer turned away from Parisian subject matter in favor of the themes that would occupy him for the rest of his life, especially nudes in pastoral landscapes, family scenes, women, and children. He returned to Spain in 1911, establishing himself in his hometown of Sitges. There he painted numerous landscape paintings in which he highlights his preoccupation with capturing the Mediterranean light through the use of very light colours marking a clear rupture with his darker paintings executed in Paris. His compositions are noted as an example of balance, though sacrificing technical perfection for the benefit of a more intense evocative power.

He was an important influence on younger Catalan artists such as Miró.

Gallery

Notes

References
Cowling, Elizabeth; Jennifer Mundy (1990). On Classic Ground: Picasso, Léger, de Chirico and the New Classicism 1910-1930. London: Tate Gallery. 
 Various, Enciclopedia Monitor (1972). Barcelona: Salvat S.A. de Ediciones.  (complete works)

External links 
  EPDLP.com
  Santander Foundation

Painters from Catalonia
1875 births
1956 deaths
20th-century Spanish painters
20th-century Spanish male artists
Spanish male painters